The Jeep Wagoneer is a sport utility vehicle (SUV) nameplate of Jeep vehicles, with several models marketed for the 1963 through 1993 model years and again since the 2022 model year.

Various versions of the Wagoneer were manufactured in the US and other nations by Kaiser Motors (1962−1971), by American Motors (1971−1987), by Chrysler (1987−1993), and Stellantis from 2021.
 
A revival of the Jeep Wagoneer was introduced as a concept version on September 3, 2020, and as the production model on March 11, 2021. Sales begin in the second half of 2021 with 2022 model year versions.



First generation (SJ; 1963)

The first Wagoneer is the original full-size SUV-style design produced between 1962 and 1991. It was introduced in November 1962 for the 1963 model year as a successor to the Willys Jeep Station Wagon that had been built since 1946. It is a full-size body-on-frame vehicle that shared its architecture with the Gladiator pickup truck. The vehicle was introduced as a station wagon body style, later the pioneering design became known as a "sport utility vehicle" (SUV).

Available initially with rear-wheel drive, the four-wheel drive SJ-body Wagoneer remained in production for 29 model years (1963–1991) with an almost unchanged body structure.

Second generation (XJ; 1983) 

The second-generation Wagoneer is an upscale version of the unibody-based compact XJ Cherokee produced between 1983 and 1990. The compact XJ Wagoneer was available in two trim levels: the "Wagoneer" and the "Wagoneer Limited". These vehicles were intended to replace the SJ-body Wagoneer models, but high demand prompted American Motors, and Chrysler after 1987, to keep the original SJ-body Wagoneer in production.

Third generation (ZJ; 1993) 

The Wagoneer nameplate was reintroduced for one year as the top-of-the-line model of the Jeep ZJ platform that debuted on the mid-size Grand Cherokee for the 1993 model year. Called the Grand Wagoneer, it featured a long list of standard equipment including the Magnum 5.2 L V8 engine and unique leather interior as well as the Grand Wagoneer's traditional exterior woodgrain applique. After 6,378 were produced, the model was dropped for 1994, leaving the Grand Cherokee Limited as the top-of-the-line Jeep.

Fourth generation (WS; 2022) 

The fourth-generation Wagoneer and Grand Wagoneer are full-size SUVs and full-size luxury SUVs based on the Ram 1500 (DT) chassis. It was revealed in March 2021 for the 2022 model year as the flagship model Jeep. Production of the fourth-generation Jeep Wagoneers began in 2021.

Notes

References 

Wagoneer
Sport utility vehicles
Station wagons
Cars introduced in 1963
1960s cars
1970s cars
1980s cars
1990s cars
2020s cars
Kaiser Motors
AMC vehicles
Flagship vehicles